Phi Cygni, Latinized from φ Cygni, is a binary star system in the northern constellation of Cygnus. It is faintly visible to the naked eye with an apparent visual magnitude of 4.70. The annual parallax shift is 12.25 mas as measured from Earth, which yields a distance estimate of around 266 light years. It is moving further from the Sun with a radial velocity of +4.5 km/s.

φ Cygni is a double-lined spectroscopic binary system, which means that the absorption lines of both components are visible in the spectrum.  The two sets of spectral lines are almost identical and both stars are assigned a spectral type of K0III, meaning they have evolved into giants.  They are considered to be red clump giants, stars that have begun core helium fusion and lie on the horizontal branch but because of their metallicity and the size of their hydrogen envelope they are found very close to the red giant branch. The two stars are assumed to have the same age, which would be around 650 million years.  The pair have an orbital period of 434.208 days, or 1.2 Earth years, a semimajor axis of 26.9 mas, and a high eccentricity of 0.56.

References

K-type giants
Horizontal-branch stars
Spectroscopic binaries
Cygnus (constellation)
Cygni, Phi
Durchmusterung objects
Cygni, 12
185734
096683
7478